Noshiro Maru was a Nippon Yusen Kaisen (NYK) Liner completed in 1934 and requisitioned by the Imperial Japanese Army (IJA) in 1937 to transport troops to China following the Marco Polo Bridge Incident. She was later returned to civilian service before being converted to an armed merchant cruiser by the Imperial Japanese Navy (IJN) in 1941. She was bombed twice and torpedoed twice as a World War II troopship before being abandoned at Manila in 1944.

History
Noshiro Maru was completed at Nagasaki in 1934 by Mitsubishi Shipbuilding for the (NYK) Line. Its maiden voyage was to New York City in 1935. Following the Marco Polo Bridge Incident in July, the IJA requisitioned Noshiro Maru as transport No. 226 on 8 August 1937 for moving Japanese infantry to Wusong. Noshiro Maru was part of convoys landing the 18th Infantry Regiment on 2 September and the 36th Infantry Regiment on 26 September. Noshiro Maru resumed commercial service for the NYK line on 7 January 1939, but was requisitioned by the IJN on 1 May 1941 for conversion to a seaplane tender. Priorities were revised, and Noshiro Maru emerged from the conversion process on 14 October 1941 as an armed merchant cruiser.

Noshiro Maru was assigned to the Yokosuka patrol squadron escorting convoys of merchant ships to varied locations including Truk, Ponape, Kwajalein, and Rabaul before being redesignated as a troopship in August 1942. She completed a round trip from Japan to the Marianas and Truk in November 1942 and was detached to Rabaul on 11 December, where she was bombed by a Fifth Air Force Boeing B-17 Flying Fortress on 16 January 1943. Repairs were completed at Yokohama on 21 July 1943.

Noshiro Maru made a round trip from Japan to Balikpapan and Singapore in December 1943 and January 1944. She made a second trip to Singapore in February with convoy Hi-47 and returned to Japan in June with convoy Hi-62. After yard overhaul at Yokohama, she was attached to convoy Hi-71 carrying Operation Shō reinforcements to the Philippines. Noshiro Maru was one of several ships torpedoed that night, but temporarily beached at Port Currimao to avoid sinking, and reached Manila on 24 August.

While awaiting repairs, Noshiro Maru was caught in Manila Bay by a Task Force 38 air strike on 21 September 1944 and hit by three bombs that afternoon. The first hit the starboard side near the bridge, the second exploded in the radio room, and the third caused an engine room fire. Without engine room power for fire main pressure, the fire spread through the evening causing an ammunition explosion killing three soldiers and six crewmen.

References

World War II naval ships of Japan
Auxiliary ships of the Imperial Japanese Navy
1934 ships
Auxiliary cruisers of the Imperial Japanese Navy
Ships built by Mitsubishi Heavy Industries